Ashdown High School is a comprehensive public high school located in the town of Ashdown, Arkansas, United States. The school provides secondary education for students in grades 9 through 12. It is one of two public high schools in Little River County, Arkansas and the sole high school administered by the Ashdown School District.

Academics 
Ashdown High School is accredited by the Arkansas Department of Education (ADE) and has been accredited by AdvancED since 1929. The assumed course of study follows the Common Core curriculum developed by the ADE. Students complete regular (core and elective) and career focus coursework and exams and may take Advanced Placement (AP) courses and exams with the opportunity to receive college credit.

Athletics 
The Ashdown High School mascot and athletic emblem is the panther with purple and gold serving as the school colors.

The Ashdown Panthers compete in interscholastic activities within the 4A Classification via the 4A Region 7 Conference, as administered by the Arkansas Activities Association. Ashdown Panthers won the 3A state championship during the 2018-19 Basketball season. The Panthers field teams in football, golf, basketball, cheer, baseball, softball, and track and field.

References

External links 
 

1915 establishments in Arkansas
Educational institutions established in 1915
Public high schools in Arkansas
Schools in Little River County, Arkansas